In Greek mythology, the name Hesione (/hɪˈsaɪ.əniː/; Ancient Greek: Ἡσιονη) refers to various mythological figures:

 Hesione, a daughter of Oceanus.
Hesione, also called Isonoe, one of the Danaids who became the lover of Zeus and bore a son by him, Orchomenos.
Hesione, a Trojan princess and daughter of Laomedon.
 Hesione, one of the names given to the wife of Nauplius, who was the father of Palamedes, Oiax and Nausimedon. The mythographer Apollodorus reports that, according to Cercops Nauplius' wife was Hesione, and that in the Nostoi (Returns), an early epic from the Trojan cycle of poems about the Trojan War, his wife was Philyra, but that according to the "tragic poets" his wife was Clymene.
 Hesione, daughter of Celeus, was one of the sacrificial victims of Minotaur. She may be the sister of another victim, Porphyrion granting that their father named Celeus is the same.

Other
Wonder Woman (comic book) 1976 Volume 1: Issues 226 & 227 - A golden robot formerly owned by Hephaestus, The God of Fire

Notes

References
 Aeschylus, translated in two volumes. 1. Prometheus Bound by Herbert Weir Smyth, Ph. D. Cambridge, MA. Harvard University Press. 1926. Online version at the Perseus Digital Library. Greek text available from the same website.
Apollodorus, Apollodorus, The Library, with an English Translation by Sir James George Frazer, F.B.A., F.R.S. in 2 Volumes. Cambridge, MA, Harvard University Press; London, William Heinemann Ltd. 1921. Online version at the Perseus Digital Library.
 Dictys Cretensis, from The Trojan War. The Chronicles of Dictys of Crete and Dares the Phrygian translated by Richard McIlwaine Frazer, Jr. (1931-). Indiana University Press. 1966. Online version at the Topos Text Project.
Gantz, Timothy, Early Greek Myth: A Guide to Literary and Artistic Sources, Johns Hopkins University Press, 1996, Two volumes:  (Vol. 1),  (Vol. 2).
 Hard, Robin, The Routledge Handbook of Greek Mythology: Based on H.J. Rose's "Handbook of Greek Mythology", Psychology Press, 2004, . Google Books.
Maurus Servius Honoratus, In Vergilii carmina comentarii. Servii Grammatici qui feruntur in Vergilii carmina commentarii; recensuerunt Georgius Thilo et Hermannus Hagen. Georgius Thilo. Leipzig. B. G. Teubner. 1881. Online version at the Perseus Digital Library

Women in Greek mythology
Characters in Greek mythology